Charlotte Louise Nichols (born 5 April 1991) is a British Labour Party politician who has been the Member of Parliament for Warrington North since the 2019 General Election.

Early life
Nichols was born in Romford, London and grew up in Reading, Berkshire before moving to Liverpool where she studied politics at the University of Liverpool, graduating in 2013.

She has three sisters and three step-siblings. Her father Ged Nichols is from Kirkby, Merseyside and is the General Secretary of the financial services trade union Accord he was appointed as the president of the TUC in 2020. Her mother is from East London.

She became interested in politics from a young age and said in an interview she was obsessed with the then Speaker of the House of Commons Betty Boothroyd and the Speakers shouts of “Order”.

As a teenager she had one of her earliest experiences of politics when she helped run after-school UK Youth Parliament activities with future Conservative Prime Minister Theresa May.

Nichols was a women's officer for Young Labour.

Identity 
Politically she identifies as being on the left of the Labour Party and is said to come from a progressive trade union background. Nichols supported Jeremy Corbyn in both the 2015 and 2016 Labour Party leadership elections. Corbyn was subsequently elected with 59.5% of the vote in 2015 and 61.8% of the vote in 2016 as leader of the Labour Party.

Religiously, she grew up in a mostly secular Catholic family with some Irish heritage. At the age of 22 Nichols started to attend weekly services at the Manchester Reform synagogue, after attending the services she claimed to felt more peace than she ever had growing up as a Catholic. In 2014 she converted to Judaism a few years later and on her 27th birthday she celebrated her bat mitzvah.

Since converting to Judaism Nichols has faced ongoing abuse for her beliefs and religion including anti-Semitism from a Conservative Party council candidate for the Warrington Borough Council 2021 local elections. The candidate sent a message via twitter to Nichols saying “Keep the Aryan race going”.

In 2021 during an interview Nichols identified as being bisexual. She is one of over 60 MPs in the house of commons who identifies as LGBT+. Nichols has faced abuse for her identity including being acused of using her religion and sexuality to win votes. A leaked WhatsApp message from a local Conservative parliamentary candidate read "We always said she’ll pull out a disability at an appropriate time to go with Jewish ginger LGBT."

In 2022, Nichols spoke openly about her challenges with her mental health. Nichols opened up about her struggles and serious physical abuse she has faced after a BBC investigation found she was in the top 5 of backbench MPs to receive abusive and toxic tweets on Twitter.

Pre-political career 
After graduating from the University of Liverpool in 2013, Nichols worked in Salford for five years for the Union of Shop, Distributive and Allied Workers. Supporting logistics workers from Warrington employed at Hermes (Now Evri), Yodel and XPO Logistics with pay and conditions negotiations.

Nichols then went on to work for the GMB trade union as a national research and policy officer, where she campaigned for better term and conditions for Amazon and Asda workers.

While working for GMB, Nichols made the case for Government to invest in low-carbon nuclear technology. Warrington is home to one of the UK’s largest clusters of nuclear services.

Political career
Nichols stood as the Labour Party candidate for Warrington North at the 2019 General Election. She was elected with a majority of 1,509 votes holding the constituency for Labour. There was a reduction in the overall majority which followed the broader trend of the 2019 election, where many northern, Labour voting constituencies voted Conservative for the first time the so called "Red Wall".

In the Shadow Cabinet of Jeremy Corbyn, she served as the PPS to Tracy Brabin as Shadow Secretary of State for Digital, Culture, Media and Sport for a brief period during the 2020 Labour Party leadership election, before being moved in the Shadow Cabinet of Sir Keir Starmer to being PPS to Emily Thornberry as Shadow Secretary of State for International Trade. When Ruth Jones was promoted to Shadow Air Qualities Minister, Nichols replaced her as PPS to Shadow Northern Ireland Secretary Louise Haigh.

On 12 November 2020, Nichols was appointed Shadow Minister for Women and Equalities. She stepped down from this role in September 2021, coinciding with the resignation of the Shadow Secretary of State Marsha de Cordova, citing personal reasons.

Nichols supported Rebecca Long-Bailey in the 2020 Labour Party leadership election, but nominated Emily Thornberry to broaden the field of candidates.

In April 2021, Nichols apologised to the Traveller communities after she distributed a local election leaflet which pledged to deal with "Traveller incursions". The leaflet had been circulated in the Orford ward of her constituency during the 2021 Local Elections, in response to encampments on the nearby Poole Park. Nichols apologised and issued a statement, saying: “I have spoken to the local Labour party, the leaflet has been withdrawn and the leaflet will be destroyed. I regret that this leaflet has been distributed in the town. The leaflet is not in line with my personal values or those of the Labour party." Nichols pledged to be "an ally" to the Gypsy, Roma and Traveller community.

Historical events
Prior to the General Election of December 2019, Nichols used an article on the website LabourList defended defended Corbyn's attendance at a Seder to celebrate the Jewish festival of Pesach, organised by the far-left Jewish diaspora group Jewdas. The event was later criticized in article which appeared in The Times after allegations emerged that attendees had engaged in chants of "fuck the police" and "fuck the armies".

In October 2019 a group of S.S. Lazio fans who had been filmed making Nazi salutes in Glasgow should "get their heads kicked in". Nichols, who is Jewish, defended her comments in December, "These were people doing Nazi salutes on the streets of Britain... As a Jewish person whose grandfather fought in World War Two, ultimately sometimes I believe that fascism has to be physically confronted".

An article published in the Daily Telegraph in 2019 reported that Nichols had described members of the Green Party as "bourgeois scab fucks" and told one Twitter user, "Hope you lose your virginity".

References

External links

Living people
21st-century British women politicians
Alumni of the University of Liverpool
Bisexual politicians
Bisexual women
British Reform Jews
Converts to Reform Judaism
English anti-fascists
Trade unionists from Greater Manchester 
Female members of the Parliament of the United Kingdom for English constituencies
Jewish anti-fascists
Jewish British politicians
Jewish women politicians
Labour Party (UK) MPs for English constituencies
LGBT Jews
LGBT members of the Parliament of the United Kingdom
English LGBT politicians
People from Reading, Berkshire
People from Romford
Politicians from London
UK MPs 2019–present
Women trade unionists
1991 births
21st-century English women
21st-century English people
21st-century LGBT people